Divine Horsemen: The Living Gods of Haiti is a black-and-white documentary film of approximately 52 minutes. It is about dance and possession in Haitian vodou that was shot by experimental filmmaker Maya Deren between 1947 and 1954.

In 1981, twenty years after Deren's death, the film was completed by Deren's third husband Teiji Ito (1935-1982) and his wife Cherel Winett Ito (1947-1999). Most of the film consists of images of dancing and bodies in motion during rituals in Rada and Petro services.

Deren had studied dance as well as photography and filmmaking. She originally went to Haiti, with the funding from a Guggenheim fellowship, and the stated intention of filming the dancing that forms a crucial part of the vodou ceremony. In 1953, Deren's book Divine Horsemen: The Voodoo Gods of Haiti, on the subject of vodou, was published by Vanguard Press.

The film that resulted, however, reflected Deren's increasing personal engagement with vodou and its practitioners (Wilcken, 1986). While this ultimately resulted in Deren disregarding the guidelines of the fellowship, Deren was able to record scenes that probably would have been inaccessible to other filmmakers.

Deren's original notes, film footage, and wire recordings are in the Maya Deren Collection at Boston University's Howard Gotlieb Archival Research Center and at Anthology Film Archives.

References
Lois E. Wilcken, Review of Divine Horsemen: The Living Gods of Haiti 
Maya Deren, Divine Horsemen: The Voodoo Gods of Haiti (New York: Vanguard Press, 1953) original edition of Deren's book 
Teiji Ito and Cheryl Ito, Ethnomusicology, Vol. 30, No. 2. (Spring -Summer 1986), pp. 313–318.
Notes on Deren's Haitian Footage, Maya Deren Forum.
"Maya Deren's Ethnographic Representation of Ritual and Myth in Haiti", Moira Sullivan, in Maya Deren and the American Avant-Garde, Bill Nichols, editor, 2001.

External links
Divine Horsemen: The Living Gods of Haiti at IMDB

1985 films
American black-and-white films
American documentary films
Haitian Vodou
1985 documentary films
Films set in Haiti
Films directed by Maya Deren
1980s English-language films
1950s English-language films
1950s American films
1980s American films